Borislav Gyulemetov (born 21 April 1985) is a Bulgarian association footballer who is currently playing as a defender for Bulgarian club Vidima-Rakovski Sevlievo.

References

1985 births
Living people
Bulgarian footballers
First Professional Football League (Bulgaria) players
PFC Vidima-Rakovski Sevlievo players
Association football defenders